The Science Express is a mobile scientific exhibition for children mounted on a train which travels across India. The project was launched on 30 October 2007 at the Safdarjung railway station, Delhi by the Department of Science and Technology (DST), Government of India. Although open to all, the project primarily targets students and teachers. , the train has had nine phases and has showcased exhibitions on three themes.  The first four phases from 2007 to 2011 were called "Science Express" and were focused on micro and macro cosmos. The next three phases from 2012 to 2014 remodelled the exhibits as "Biodiversity Special". The eighth and ninth phase from 2015 to 2017 was redesigned to focus on "Climate Change".

Collaborations and exhibits 
The project was initiated by the Department of Science and Technology (DST) in 2007 primarily focusing for students and teachers and has no entry fee. DST focused the first four phases on micro and macro cosmos and highlighted the developing newer researches being done in the fields of science and technology worldwide. It covered topics like the Big Bang, building blocks of life, genes,  senses, and universe.

The second theme focused on biodiversity within India and was modeled jointly by DST and Ministry of Environment, Forest and Climate Change (MoEFCC). It covered the diverse aspects of life in Trans-Himalayan and the Himalayan regions, the Gangetic Plains, the North Easterns hilly areas, the deserts, the coastal Western Ghats, the Deccan Plateau, and various islands. A "Kids Zone" was also introduced for fun activities like puzzles and games related to science.

The third theme was designed for Climate Change and was developed as collaborative work between DST, MoEFCC, Department of Biotechnology (DBT), Ministry of Railways, Vikram A Sarabhai Community Science Centre (VASCSC) and Wildlife Institute of India (WII). The ninth phase of the exhibition had 16 coaches of which eight were developed by MoEFCC. Solar panels have been installed on rooftop of some coaches and facilities to train teachers is also available. A team from the VASCSC, which manages the entire exhibit, guides students through the exhibition and also engages into activities on the railway platform. Dilip Sarkar, executive director of VASCSC said that the exhibit aims to "transform the vehicle into a people's movement and motivate them to take individual actions to fight climate change".

In over 1,600 days for which it has been exhibited it has been visited by nearly 1.5 crore (15 million) people with students from over 33,800 schools. The exhibition thus held record of being the largest, the longest running and the most visited exhibition as noted in the Limca Book of Records.

Statistics

Gallery

References

External links 

 Official website

2007 establishments in Delhi
Express trains in India
Ministry of Science and Technology (India)
Science education in India